Norsk Målungdom (NMU, literally The Norwegian Language Youth) is an organization of youth working for the Nynorsk written standard of Norwegian and the Norwegian dialects. It is the youth organization of Noregs Mållag.

See also
 Studentmållaget i Oslo

External links
Website of Norsk Målungdom 
Website of Noregs Mållag 
nynorsk.no - news about Nynorsk (in Norwegian) 

Language organisations of Norway
Youth organisations based in Norway